Sandy Mölling (born 27 April 1981) is a German singer and television personality. She rose to fame as one of the members of the girl group No Angels, which were formed in 2000 on the German television talent show Popstars, becoming one of the best-selling girl groups of European origin of all time. During their hiatus, Mölling released a solo album, Unexpected (2004), which produced the top ten singles "Unnatural Blonde" and "Tell Me", and became a judge on the fourth season of Popstars.

In 2006, she released her second studio album Frame of Mind to moderate success and finished third on the debut season of Let's Dance. The following year, she became a presenter and actress in several short-living television shows on Sat.1, Das Vierte, and VIVA Germany before serving as a judge on Die singende Firma. In 2010, Mölling made her stage debut in the musical Vom Geist der Weihnacht, which led her to parts in productions such as Joseph and the Amazing Technicolor Dreamcoat and Cabaret. For starring as Eliza Doolittle in the 2016 Bad Hersfeld revival of the musical My Fair Lady, she won the Audience Award for Favorite Actress.

Throughout her career, Mölling has scored four number-one hits and sold over five million albums and singles worldwide. Outside her work in the entertainment industry, she is involved in many charitable activities, promoting various causes, including education, children's care and animal welfare. In 2015, she co-authored the children's book Pumpel, der Baumzwerg along with her mother.

Early life 
Mölling was born in Wuppertal, North Rhine-Westphalia, West Germany, to Lothar Mölling, a graduate engineer, and his first wife, Dagmar Sprenger-Fuchs, a nurse. She has three brothers, Brian, Kevin and Dustin, and a younger half sister named Melina. After her parents' divorce, Mölling, her mother, and her siblings moved from Remscheid to Koblenz, where she finished secondary school and later quit the gymnasium to start an apprenticeship as a retail saleswoman at a jeans retailer. Mölling performed in various singing competitions and became a studio singer in her teenage years.

Career

2000–2003: Breakthrough with No Angels 

 In 2000, Mölling auditioned for the debut installment of the German reality television program Popstars, entering the competition with thousands of other women. She earned a position in the top 30 finalists and immediately travelled to Mallorca, Spain to join her competitors for a workshop, where she made it to the final 10 on the show despite of her struggle with dancing choreographies. During a special episode in November 2000, jury member Moslener eventually disclosed that Sandy was chosen to become part of the final five-member girl group No Angels.
With the final five members of the band in place, Popstars continued tracking the development and struggles of the group who left homes to move into a shared flat near Munich, Bavaria. However, it took another four months until the band released their debut single "Daylight in Your Eyes", which would subsequently appear on the band's debut album Elle'ments (2001). Both the single and the album became an unexpected but record-breaking success, when both instantly entered the top position on the Austrian, German and Swiss Media Control singles, albums and airplay charts, making No Angels one of the most successful debuts in years.
 
In the following years, No Angels released another two number-one studio albums, Now... Us! and Pure, a live album and a successful swing album branded When the Angels Swing, totalling twelve singles altogether - including four-number one singles. Eventually selling more than five million singles and albums worldwide, No Angels became the best-selling German girl group to date and the second most successful girl group of continental Europe between the years of 2001 and 2003 after Atomic Kitten. On 5 September 2003 the four remaining members of the band (Jessica Wahls had left the band following the birth of her first child in March 2003) announced that they would no longer be performing together after three years of continual touring and increasing cases of illness. The release of The Best of No Angels in November of the same year marked the end of the band, with each member going their separate ways in early 2004.

2004–2006: Career development 
A strong opponent of the disbandment of No Angels, Mölling, who felt less exhausted than her former bandmates, launched her solo career only months after the group's final concert. The singer spent much of early 2004 with the recording of her solo debut album Unexpected which saw her reteaming with No Angels' Scandinavian team of songwriters and producers, including Niclas Molinder and Joacim Persson of production team Twin. Produced under the group's former label, Cheyenne Records, it was preceded by the single "Unnatural Blonde" which reached number eight on the German Singles Chart and would become the highest-charting single among the solo releases by all former band members. The summer-laid follow-up "Tell Me", a ballad, saw similar success in August of the same year, becoming another top ten hit.

 In mid-2004, Mölling along with Lukas Loules and Uwe Fahrenkrog-Petersen joined the jury on Popstars – Jetzt oder nie!, the fourth season of the German Popstars adaptation, becoming the first former winner to serve as a judge. Unexpected was released on 13 September 2004 and debuted at number 13 on the German Albums Chart. It earned a generally mixed reception from critics who called it uneven and compared the sound to No Angels's latest records. A remix version of the album opener "Unexpected" featuring additional vocals from German rapper Manuellsen, was released as the album's third and final single and served as Rhineland-Palatinate's entry at the Bundesvision Song Contest 2005 after Mölling had been chosen to represent state at the annual song competition. The singer eventually finished last with 10 points, while the single entered at a moderate number 29 on the German Singles Chart. One of the commercially most successful female singers of the year in Germany, Mölling received Echo Award and 1 Live Krone nominations in the Female Artist National categories for her solo efforts.

After a few hosting jobs and a sudden label change Sandy released her minor succeeded second album, Frame of Mind (#53), in May 2006 via Starwatch Music. The album's first single, "Crash", was a cover version of the same-titled 1988 UK hit (released by The Primitives) and peaked at number 24 on the German singles chart. Additionally Sandy was seen as a competitor in TV contest Let's Dance, eventually ending third. The album's second single, "Living without You" was released in November 2006 and entered the German Singles Chart at number 36.The song was lyrically dedicated to her step father who died in early 2005.

2007–2011: Reformation of the band
In mid-2006, Mölling agreed upon former bandmate Lucy Diakovska's request to reunite for a musical comeback. However, all band members have affirmed that they will continue to pursue individual careers as solo artists at suitable opportunities. Sandy has also presented three television programmes on two different German networks, including Autsch TV on Das Vierte and both Du bist... and Damenwahl on the music channel VIVA.

2012–present: Further solo commitments
In 2017, Mölling appeared on the second season of German competitive dancing talent show Dance Dance Dance. She was paired with fellow Popstars winner Bahar Kızıl, former member of pop trio Monrose.

Personal life
Mölling has one son, Jayden Mölling (born 27 March 2009), by her former long-time friend and manager Renick Bernadina, whom she split from in 2008. Since 2009, she has been romantically involved with Canadian songwriter Nasri Tony Atweh. The two met while working on the No Angels album Welcome to the Dance. In October 2015, she had her second son Noah. The family resides in Studio City, Los Angeles.

Discography

Studio albums

Singles

References

External links

 Sandy-Moelling.com 
 

1981 births
Living people
Musicians from Wuppertal
Musicians from Koblenz
Participants in the Bundesvision Song Contest
No Angels
No Angels members
German women pop singers
English-language singers from Germany
Popstars winners
Eurovision Song Contest entrants of 2008
Eurovision Song Contest entrants for Germany
Mass media people from Wuppertal
German expatriates in the United States